The Ukraine Democracy Defense Lend-Lease Act of 2022 is an act of the United States Congress that facilitates the supply of materiel to the Ukrainian government in a manner similar to the World War II Lend-Lease Act in response to the Russian invasion of Ukraine.

Provisions

The full title of the act is “An Act To provide enhanced authority for the President to enter into agreements with the Government of Ukraine to lend or lease defense articles to that Government to protect civilian populations in Ukraine from Russian military invasion, and for other purposes.”

The legislation reduces red tape on exports of defense equipment from the USA to Ukraine, in order to ensure that the equipment is delivered promptly. It is applicable to fiscal years 2022 and 2023. 

The legislation is named in reference to the World War II era Lend-Lease program that supplied US allies in the fight against the Axis powers and is credited with being a deciding factor in the war.

Passage of legislation

The bill was passed unanimously in the US Senate on April 6, 2022, and passed in the House of Representatives by a vote of 417–10 on April 28, 2022.

The ten representatives, all from the Republican Party, who voted against the bill were: Andy Biggs of Arizona, Dan Bishop of North Carolina, Warren Davidson of Ohio, Matt Gaetz of Florida, Paul Gosar of Arizona, Marjorie Taylor Greene of Georgia, Thomas Massie of Kentucky, Ralph Norman of South Carolina, Scott Perry of Pennsylvania and Tom Tiffany of Wisconsin.

President Joe Biden signed the bill into law on May 9, 2022, Soviet Victory Day, which has turned into a fiercely nationalist event in Russia, leading critics to term it pobedobesie (victory mania). This signing date was seen as a "rejoinder to Russian President Vladimir Putin, who has seized on Victory in Europe Day — the anniversary of Germany’s unconditional surrender in 1945 and Russia’s biggest patriotic holiday — to rally his people behind the invasion."

Text

See also 
List of foreign aid to Ukraine during the Russo-Ukrainian War
United States foreign aid

References

External links

 Ukraine Democracy Defense Lend-Lease Act of 2022 (PDF) as enacted in the US Statutes at Large
S.3522 Ukraine Democracy Defense Lend-Lease Act of 2022 on Congress.gov

2022 in international relations
Acts of the 117th United States Congress
United States foreign relations legislation
United States legislation
Reactions to the 2022 Russian invasion of Ukraine
Ukraine–United States relations
Presidency of Joe Biden
United States foreign aid